The Feeler (previously ) is an outdoor sculpture, located on the Üsküdar University campus in Üsküdar, İstanbul, Turkey. Installed in front of the  Altunizade Central Campus, it was commissioned in 2011. Small sized versions of the sculpture are given by the University, as awards.

Meaning
The Feeler is symbol about understanding the human. It is accepted today that feelings like anger, hatred, animosity, love have biochemical representations in the brain. The Feeler symbol of Üsküdar University represents activating nice feelings and maintaining good feelings instead of malicious ones. Those who can generate awareness about feelings are the lucky ones who can feel "The Feeler" and the life alike. The Feeler is the representative of human values which remind the importance of considering, helping others, getting help from others, sharing feelings in order to be happy.

Award 

The University awards statuettes of the feeler to people who are recognized in their areas of expertise.

Recipients 

 Bruce Lawrence
 Andy Mabbett
 Mustafa Somuncu

Name 

References

External links 

 

Üsküdar
2011 sculptures
Sculptures in Turkey